Villagelo Vinayakudu ( Vinayakudu in the Village) is a 2009 Telugu-language comedy film produced by Mahi V Raghav, written, and directed by Sai Kiran Adivi. The film is a sequel to the 2008 hit, Vinayakudu. Krishnudu reprises his role as Karthik in this film, whilst Saranya Mohan plays the female lead, and Rao Ramesh plays the role of her father. Telugu novel writer Yandamuri Veerendranath makes his acting debut in a small but vital role. The film was released on 5 November 2009 and received positive reviews. It fared well at the box office and ran for 75 days.

Plot
Karthik (Krishnudu) is a teacher by profession and falls in love with a medico Kavya (Sharanya Mohan). Kavya's father Colonel Lakshmipati (Rao Ramesh) is a retired army officer living in a farmhouse in the village, with his brothers and family. Kavya loses her mother at young age, so her father has never refused her wishes. When she musters courage to tell her father about her love, Karthik comes to her home all of a sudden. He tells Lakshmipati that he is in love with his daughter. Lakshmipati is dead set against the marriage and does not want this stout guy for a son-in-law. Lakshmipati's friend Bhaskaram (Yandamuri) further complicates Krishnudu's prospects with some silly ideas. Rest of the drama is how Krishnudu wins the heart of Lakshmipati.

Cast 

Krishnudu as Karthik 
Saranya Mohan as Kavya 
Rao Ramesh as Colonel Lakshmipati
Yandamuri Veerendranath as Bhaskaram 
Bharath Reddy as Bharath Verma

Publicity and Marketing
Producers of the film partnered with 98.3 FM Radio Mirchi, TV9, Gemini Music, Meraux Animations, APTDC, Kalamandir, and Reliance Mobile. On 29 October 2009, the crew of the film had a publicity road trip from Hyderabad to Visakhapatnam to Vijayawada, promoting the film to people.

Soundtrack
The soundtrack and background score is composed by Manikanth Kadri. The music was released on 15 September 2009 at Kalamandir, Kukatpally, Hyderabad. The audio rights of the soundtrack were purchased by Madhura Entertainment. Each CD was priced at Rs. 9.98. A Reliance GSM SIM card came with each CD as a marketing strategy by the producer.

References

http://www.thehindu.com/todays-paper/tp-features/tp-cinemaplus/entering-new-territory/article3729110.ece

External links

2000s Telugu-language films
2009 films
Indian sequel films
Films directed by Sai Kiran Adivi